The Chia-Le-Fu Night Market is a night market in West District, Chiayi City, Taiwan.

History
In May 2016, Chiayi City Deputy Mayor Hou Chong-wen promoted the online registration of food sold at the night market in order to raise awareness of food safety and cleanliness.

Architecture
The night market spans over an area of 1,800 m2 which consists more than 300 food stalls.

Transportation
The night market is accessible within walking distance south west of Chiayi Station of Taiwan Railways.

See also
 List of night markets in Taiwan

References

External links
 

Night markets in Chiayi
West District